The members of the 3rd Manitoba Legislature were elected in the Manitoba general election held in December 1878. The legislature sat from February 1, 1879, to November 26, 1879.

Premier John Norquay with the support of Joseph Royal was able to form a majority government. However, Royal demanded that the government must have the support of a majority among both French-speaking and English-speaking representatives in the assembly. Royal, in partnership with Thomas Scott, attempted to take control of the government. Norquay countered by aligning himself with the English-speaking members of the assembly excluding Scott. A new election was held later in the year.

John Wright Sifton served as speaker for the assembly.

There was one session of the 3rd Legislature:

Joseph-Édouard Cauchon was Lieutenant Governor of Manitoba.

Members of the Assembly 
The following members were elected to the assembly in 1878:

Notes:

By-elections 
No by-elections were held to replace members.

References 

Terms of the Manitoba Legislature
1879 establishments in Manitoba
1879 disestablishments in Manitoba